Edgewood Plantation was a small cotton plantation of 1840 acres (7½ km2) located in northern Leon County, Florida, USA owned by Dr. William Bradford.

Location 
Edgewood Plantation was located in the general area of Bradfordville near Thomas Anderson Bradford's Walnut Hill Plantation, and Edward Bradford's Pine Hill Plantation, and Richard H. Bradford's Water Oak Plantation.

Plantation specifics 
The Leon County Florida 1860 Agricultural Census shows that Edgewood Plantation had the following:
 Improved Land: unknown
 Unimproved Land: unknown
 Cash value of plantation: unknown
 Cash value of farm implements/machinery: $75
 Cash value of farm animals: $870
 Number of slaves: N/A
 Bushels of corn: N/A
 Bales of cotton: N/A

The owner 
William Bradford was born in 1829 in Enfield, North Carolina and became the doctor for the slaves at Pine Hill Plantation.

References 
Rootsweb Plantations
Largest Slaveholders from 1860 Slave Census Schedules
Paisley, Clifton; From Cotton To Quail, University of Florida Press, c1968.

Plantations in Leon County, Florida
Cotton plantations in Florida